Camilla de Rossi (fl. 1670–1710) was an Italian composer known for composing oratorios in Vienna during the early 1700s. De Rossi has the most surviving works of the women composers in Northern Italy and Austria during this period.

Biography 
Camilla likely had Roman citizenship, as she signed the title pages of her manuscripts as Romana, or 'a woman of Roman descent'. Rossi composed four oratorios for solo voices and orchestra, all of which were commissioned by Emperor Joseph I of Austria and were performed in the Imperial Chapel in Vienna. She may have lived in Vienna while composing her works.

Other information about de Rossi is scarce, as the only surviving materials mentioning her are her scores, libretti, and calendar notations marking performances of her works.

Work
All of Rossi’s surviving works demonstrate an intimate knowledge of stringed instruments and, as Barbara Garvey Jackson describes, "a keen interest in tone color". Her oratorios are all for solo voices with orchestra accompaniment; none of her works use choruses.  She calls for various instruments (chalumeaux, archlute, trumpets, oboe) with string orchestra (including continuo). Her oratorio, Il Sacrifizio di Abramo, reveals her knowledge of instruments, strings in particular, but also demands two chalumeaux, an instrument first heard in Vienna in 1707, one year before her oratorio was performed for the first time in 1708. Her cantata Frá Dori e Fileno is for strings and two soloists.

List of works 
Oratorios, for solo voices, orchestra (MSS incl. some libs and orch pts in A-Wm; arias ed. B.G. Jackson in Arias from Oratorios by Women Composers of the Eighteenth Century, Fayetteville, AR, 1987–99):
Santa Beatrice d’Este (Benedetto Pamphili), 1707 
Il sacrifizio di Abramo (F. Dario), 1708 
Il figliuol prodigo (C. de Rossi),1709 
Sant’Alessio, 1710
Frà Dori, e Fileno (cant.), S, A, str orch, D-Dl, ed. B.G. Jackson (Fayetteville, 1983)

Discography
Rossi, Camilla de: Sinfonia [with lute] from "Il Sacrifizio di Abramo, Perf. Terrie Baune, Judith Nelson and the Bay Area Women's Philharmonic. Providence, RI. Newport Classic, 1990
Oratorio "Sant'Alessio", perf. Ensemble Musica Fiorita, Daniela Dolci, director (soloists Graham Pushee, countertenor; Rosa Dominguez, soprano; Agnieszka Kowalezyk, soprano; William Lombardi, tenor), pan classics 510 136, 2001
"Il Sacrifizio di Abramo", Weser-Renaissance, Manfred Cordes, conductor (Soloists Susanna Rydén, soprano; Rolf Popken, alto; Jon Strömberg, tenor), Classic Produktion Osnabrück, cpo 999 3712, 1996
 Santa Beatrice d'Este, Musica Fiorita; Daniela Dolci, conductor; (Soloists Graciella Oddone: Santa Beatrice, soprano; Denis Lakey: countertenor), ORF Edition Alte Musik, CD 3092

Bibliography
Jackson, Barbara Garvey: "Camilla de Rossi," Grove Music Online (1/28/07), http://www.grovemusic.com
Jackson, Barbara Garvey: "Camilla de Rossi," Composers born 1600–1699, New York, G.K. Hall, 1996, ed. Sylvia Glickman and Martha Furman Schleifer.
Jackson, Barbara Garvey, Arias from oratorios by women composers of the eighteenth century. Vols. 1, 2, 3, 4, 5, 7. Fayetteville, Arkansas, ClarNan Editions, 1987–1999. Volume 1 also includes Catterina Benedetta Grazianini and Maria Margharita Grimani

References

Italian Baroque composers
Italian women classical composers
18th-century Italian composers
18th-century Italian women
18th-century women composers